Jordan competed in the 2018 Asian Games in Jakarta and Palembang, Indonesia from 18 August to 2 September 2018. This was Jordan's eighth time competing in the Asian Games, following their first participation in 1986 Seoul. The team has won a total of 33 medals since, including three gold, 15 silver and 15 bronze.

Medalists

The following Jordan competitors won medals at the Games.

|  style="text-align:left; width:78%; vertical-align:top;"|

|  style="text-align:left; width:22%; vertical-align:top;"|

Competitors 
The following is a list of the number of competitors representing Jordan that participated at the Games:

Athletics 

Jordan entered one women's athlete to participate in the athletics competition at the Games.

Basketball 

Summary

3x3 basketball
Jordan national 3x3 team participated in the Games, the men's team placed in the pool C based on the FIBA 3x3 federation ranking.

Men's tournament

Roster
The following is the Jordan roster in the men's 3x3 basketball tournament of the 2018 Asian Games.
Rayyan Jarrad
Hanna Juha
Omar Bukhari
Shaker Shubair

Pool C

Boxing 

The boxers team was named on 16 July 2018.

Men

Contract bridge 

Men

Mixed

Ju-jitsu 

Men

Women

Judo 

One judoka competed at the Games.

Men

Karate 

Jordan entered the karate competition with 6 athletes (4 men's and 2 women's). The team includes by two Asian Champions and the former Asian Games silver medalists Abdelrahman Al-Masatfa and Bashar Al-Najjar.

Swimming 

Men

Taekwondo 

Kyorugi

References 

Nations at the 2018 Asian Games
2018
Asian Games